The Protomen are an American rock band who started their career composing concept albums loosely based on the video game series Mega Man. Their stage names are largely references to pop culture films, song titles, and fictional characters. The group members refer to themselves as storytellers, creating a "rock and roll fable".

History
The band is composed mostly of MTSU recording program graduates, and originated in order to meet class deadlines and the need to record for their grades. Their first live performance was in April 2004. Most of the band had graduated and moved to Nashville by 2005.

In a 2009 interview, lead vocalist Panther stated, "We basically gathered up all of our good friends from the local rock bands of Murfreesboro, tied ourselves together, and tried to walk. And somehow it worked. At the time, we noticed a void in rock and roll. A hole that could only really be filled with grown men and women painting up like robots and playing some fierce and furious rock music based on a 1980s video game. We were fairly certain no one else was going to fill that hole. But, by God, it's filled now. You can thank us later."

The band has strong ties to the Murfreesboro and Nashville independent music scene, and some members perform with several bands.

The Protomen

In the band's first album, Dr. Wily is represented as an Orwellian ruler over a dystopic city, full of humans who are too scared to stand up to his control. Dr. Light creates a "perfect man, an unbeatable machine", Proto Man, to fight to free the city, but Proto Man is destroyed by the overwhelming power of Wily's armies. Defeated and despairing, Dr. Light then creates a second son, Mega Man, whom he attempts to dissuade from battle. Mega Man runs away from home and confronts his brother in an apocalyptic concluding battle. The album has been described by the band as "the sound of the end of the world" and straddles the line between chiptune and hard rock, with heavier focus on distorted 8-bit synthesizers and electronic instrumentation.

Band member Commander has stated that the album "was made specifically to go against everything our recording teachers and fellow students were trying to feed us about making everything sound pristine and 'perfect.'". The album was recorded over two years in various Murfreesboro studios, using analog rather than digital production techniques. "Due Vendetta", the group's first recorded track, was completed in April 2003. The album was produced by then-Protomen member Heath Who Hath No Name.

Act II: The Father of Death

For the band's second album the group, working with Meat Loaf producer Alan Shacklock, devised a prequel storyline to their first album. The second act details the rise of Albert Wily to power, the rivalry between himself and Thomas Light, and the tragic events which brought the City under Wily's control. The band stated that Act II was designed to sound cleaner, reflecting a time "before the bomb dropped". Accordingly, the second album reflects a much broader range of musical styles and more lyrical instrumentation, embracing references from Ennio Morricone to Bruce Springsteen to Shacklock's own Babe Ruth. The album was mastered by Richard Dodd, a Grammy-winning recording engineer.

The Protomen Present: A Night of Queen

The Protomen are known for performing, along with their original rock opera, a variety of 1970s and 1980s cover songs in their live performances, typically related to the band's preferred motifs of heroism, struggle, and self-determination. On December 10, 2010, the Protomen performed along with Nashville band Evil Bebos for the latter band's farewell concert. Evil Bebos played a set entirely composed of Black Sabbath cover songs, while the Protomen in kind performed a set of Queen covers. The live performance was recorded and mastered, and on April 19, 2012, the Protomen announced through their website and mailing list that the resulting live album, titled The Protomen Present: A Night Of Queen, would be released and was available for pre-order. Though set for a June 1, 2012 release, the album shipped early to those who pre-ordered it.

The Cover Up: Original Soundtrack From the Motion Picture
In November 2010 while performing at InDisFest in Atlanta, GA, the band announced their intention to formally record an album of cover songs. Production on the album began in February 2011 with producer Alan Shacklock, the band's second collaboration with the producer following Act II. By June 2014, the band announced that a downloadable EP would be made available to attendees of their Warped Tour 2014 performances to promote the upcoming full-length album, titled The Cover Up. The EP was released via a download code printed on a faux movie ticket stub for The Cover Up, referencing a non-existent film, packaged in a laminate sleeve attached to a lanyard commemorating the Warped Tour. The full-length album was released on January 23, 2015 to attendees of MAGFest 13, where The Protomen were performing. The following morning, on January 24, the album was made available for pre-order to the general public through the band's website.

Musical style and influences
The group has cited the influence of "artists like Syd Mead, films like Eddie and the Cruisers and Streets of Fire, books like 1984 and Atlas Shrugged... those are the pretty obvious ones you can pull out of Acts I and II. But what you might not realize is that we own every Ernest movie ever made. And we watch them all the time." The band draws inspiration from diverse sources, including Sergio Leone's films, the song "The Mexican" and musical groups Radiohead, Styx, Toto, Queen and Alabama.

Concepts and themes
The Protomen's work is inspired by the first six NES Mega Man games. This franchise has an existing storyline featured in the games, manga, and anime; however, The Protomen have concocted a dark and dystopian version of the game's underlying world. The group is generally uninterested in concerns of making their story adhere to the original. Instead, they view the games as a jumping-off point for the story they want to tell, and have borrowed surface attributes of some characters while heavily altering their histories and functions.

The band has stated that they intend to make a three-part story. Two of the parts are completed with the release of their first two albums, while the third is in outline form.
The overall story as created by the band deals with loss, and they "don't really expect it to end well for humanity."

Festival and convention performances
The Protomen have performed at a number of conventions, festivals and showcases throughout their career.

In 2007, The Protomen played at Capcom's booth at San Diego Comic Con by Capcom's invitation. In 2009, the group competed for and won the right to perform at the Bonnaroo music festival, defeating several other Nashville bands. They played two showcases at CMJ Music Marathon in October of the same year. In 2010, The Protomen took part in the SXSW music festival and the mega-gaming conventions in PAX East in Boston (2010-2013) and PAX 2010 in Seattle.  In 2011, they performed at the Houston Free Press Summer Fest. The Protomen have performed at the 2009, 2010, 2011, 2012, and 2013 Nerdapalooza Festival in Orlando, FL and began their 2011 run at MAGFest 9 in Alexandria, VA. The Protomen have made an appearance at the Middle Tennessee Anime Convention (MTAC) in Nashville, Tennessee twice; once in 2007, and again in 2011. The Protomen have also performed in Eau Claire, WI at the Plaza Hotel and Suites for No Brand Con 2013. The band also performed at the very first PAX Australia in 2013. They played Warped Tour 2014 for its entire run.  The Protomen performed at MomoCon 2015, as well as MAGFest 13 on January 23, 2015. The band returned to the MAGFest Super 2020 stage at Gaylord National as one of the festival's headliners on January 4, 2020.

Band members

Current members
 Raul Panther III – vocals, multi-instruments
 Murphy Weller – bass synthesizer, bass guitar, percussions
 Commander B. Hawkins. – synthesizer, vocoder, percussions
 Sir Dr. Robert Bakker – guitar
 Shock Magnum – guitar
 Gambler Kirkdouglas – human choir, vocals
 Reanimator Lovejoy – drums
 K.I.L.R.O.Y. – fist pumps, hand claps, armorer, sledgehammer, maracas and jarana

Former members
 Doug Fetterman – guitar
 The Merchant – human choir
 The Keeper – synthesizer, vocoder
 The Replicant – trumpet
 Demon Barber – drums
 The Dragon – drums
 Scartoe Gleason – guitar
 The Repeater – human choir
 The Keymaster – drums
 Heath Who Hath No Name – guitar
 Cobra T. Washington – guitar
 Lazer – human choir
 The Gunslinger – guitar
 Ellen Aim – human choir
 Master Blaster – trumpet
 Nightwalker T. Ranger – human choir, trumpet
 Neon Leon – guitar
 Ringo Segundo- guitar
 Turbo Lover – vocals, multi-instruments

Discography

Studio albums
The Protomen (2005)
Act II: The Father of Death (2009)
The Cover Up: Original Soundtrack From the Motion Picture (2015)

Live album
The Protomen Present: A Night of Queen (2012)
The Protomen: Live in Nashville (2020)

Soundtrack album
William Shakespeare Presents: Terminator The Second (with 84001) (2013)

EP release
The Cover Up EP (2014)

Singles
"Father of Death / No Easy Way Out" - (2008)
"Beards Going Nowhere" -  - (2008)
"I Drove All Night / Silent Running (On Dangerous Ground) – Breaking Out (2012 Edit)" - (2012)
"This City Made Us / Hold Back the Night" - (2015)
"The Fight" - (2022)

Remix album
Makeup and Vanity Set Presents: The Protomen (2007)

As a guest
 MC Frontalot, Kid Koala - "Shudders" (2014)
 TWRP - "Phantom Racer" (2018)

References

Notes

External links

 Protomen.com
 Sound Machine Records

Indie rock musical groups from Tennessee
Video game musicians
Geek rock groups
2003 establishments in Tennessee
Musical groups established in 2003
Nintendocore musical groups